Penamakuru is a village located in Krishna district of Andhra Pradesh, India (Thotlavalluru

References 

Villages in Krishna district